Galactic Trader is a 1980 video game published by Cybernautics.

Contents
Galactic Trader is a game in which the player was a general during the war, but now only commands a small ship that trades goods across the galaxy.

Reception
Glenn Mai reviewed Galactic Trader in The Space Gamer No. 38. Mai commented that "Overall, a good game despite its flaws. Although the [...] price tag might be a bit high, I must recommend this game for anyone who likes playing games against the computer."

References

External links
Review in Creative Computing

1980 video games
TRS-80 games
TRS-80-only games
Video games developed in the United States